NYU Grossman School of Medicine is a medical school of New York University, a private research university in New York City. It was founded in 1841 and is one of two medical schools of the university, with the other being the Long Island School of Medicine. NYU Grossman School of Medicine is part of NYU Langone Health, named after Kenneth Langone, the investment banker and financial backer of The Home Depot.

U.S. News & World Report ranked NYU Grossman School of Medicine as No. 2 in the nation for research and development on the 2023 “Best Graduate Schools" rankings.

History
New York University College of Medicine was established in 1841. The medical school merged with Bellevue Hospital Medical College in 1898 to form the University and Bellevue Hospital Medical College. The name NYU Grossman School of Medicine was adopted in 2019.

NYU Grossman School of Medicine is home to many key advancements in medical education. In 1854, human dissection in New York was legalized due to efforts of the faculty. In 1866, NYU professors produced a report for the Council of Hygiene and Public Health which led to establishment of New York City's Health Department. The same year, NYU opened the first outpatient clinic in the United States. In 1872, NYU Professor Steven Smith founded the American Public Health Association. In 1884, the Carnegie Laboratory, the first facility in the U.S. devoted to teaching and research in bacteriology and pathology, was established at NYU. In 1899, NYU graduate Walter Reed discovered the mosquito transmission of yellow fever. In 1932, the first department of forensic medicine in the U.S. was established at NYU. During World War II, NYU College of Medicine was one of 131 colleges and universities nationally that took part in the V-12 Navy College Training Program which offered students a path to a Navy commission. In 1941, NYU opened the first department of physical medicine and rehabilitation in the U.S. In 1948, the Institute of Physical Medicine and Rehabilitation is established by Howard A. Rusk.  In 1955, Jonas Salk, MD, developed the first vaccine against polio, and in 1957, Albert B. Sabin developed a live-virus vaccine against polio, which, when administered orally, effectively eliminated polio in the U.S. The Institute and Department of Environmental Medicine were established in 1964. In 1980, NYU professor Saul Krugman, M.D., developed the first vaccine against hepatitis B.

In 1989, Jan T. Vilcek and Junming Le create a monoclonal antibody against TNF alpha, leading to the development of the anti-inflammatory drug Remicade. In 1993 the Skirball Institute of Biomolecular Medicine opens. In 1998, the Mount Sinai-NYU Health System was established when the NYU Medical System merged with Mount Sinai Hospitals. The joint organization included Mount Sinai Hospital, Mount Sinai Hospital of Queens, Tisch Hospital, Rusk Institute of Rehabilitation Medicine, Hospital for Joint Diseases Orthopaedic Institute, NYU Downtown Hospital and Mount Sinai School of Medicine. The merger made NYU the only private university in the country with two medical schools. The union dissolved in 2003 while confronting a shared debt of $665.6 million, but NYU continued to award Mount Sinai's degrees. In 2010, however, the Mount Sinai School of Medicine was accredited by the Middle States Commission on Higher Education and became an independent degree-granting institution without a university affiliation for the first time in its history.

In 2018, NYU Grossman School of Medicine began offering full-tuition scholarships to all current and future students in its MD degree program regardless of need or merit.

In 2019 NYU Langone Health partnered with NYU to form NYU Long Island School of Medicine, a new, three-year medical school located at NYU Langone Hospital—Long Island.

Evolution of NYU Grossman School of Medicine
1841 - University Medical College organized as the Medical Department of the University of the City of New York
1861 - Bellevue Hospital Medical College Founded
1882 - New York Post-Graduate Medical School and Hospital founded (incorporated in 1886)
1896 - Name of the University of the City of New York changed to New York University
1898 - University and Bellevue Hospital Medical College formed by merging of the University Medical College and Bellevue Hospital Medical College
1935 - Name changed to New York University College of Medicine
1945 - Post-graduate Division of New York University College of Medicine established
1948 - New York University Post-Graduate Medical school formed, representing a union of the Postgraduate Division of the College of Medicine and the New York Post-Graduate Medical School
1960 - Name of New York University-Bellevue Medical Center changed to NYU Medical Center - Name of New York University College of Medicine changed to NYU School of Medicine
2008 - NYU Medical Center Hospitals and School of Medicine renamed NYU Langone Medical Center
2018 - NYU Grossman School of Medicine announced it would be offering full-tuition scholarships to all current and future students in its MD degree program
2019 - NYU School of Medicine renamed NYU Grossman School of Medicine

Timeline of notable events and discoveries

1841: The New York University College of Medicine opens, ten years after the founding of the university. Among the original faculty is John Revere, son of patriot Paul Revere, and Valentine Mott, probably the foremost surgeon of his day.
1854: Human dissection in New York is legalized due to efforts of faculty at the NYU College of Medicine. Also, the first successful resection of a hip joint is performed by Lewis A. Sayre, M.D., the first professor of orthopedic surgery in the United States.
1866: NYU professors of medicine produce a Report for the Council of Hygiene and Public Health. It leads to the establishment of New York City's Health Department.
1867: Established the first clinical professorship devoted to dermatology. Also, the first outpatient clinic in the United States opens at Bellevue Hospital.
1884: The Carnegie Laboratory, the first facility in the United States devoted to teaching and research in bacteriology and pathology, is established at the Bellevue Hospital Medical College.
1897: Merged with the New York Skin and Cancer Hospital.
1899: Dr. Walter Reed discovers the mosquito transmission of yellow fever at Bellevue Hospital Medical College.
1911: The first outpatient cardiac clinic in New York is established by Hubert V. Guile, M.D. at Bellevue Hospital.
1932: The first department of forensic medicine in the United States is established at NYU. Also, NYU organizes one of the nation's first interdisciplinary research efforts, the Rheumatic Diseases Study Group, helping to usher in the era of modern rheumatology.
1933: William S. Tillett, M.D. conducts groundbreaking studies of enzymes involved in blood clotting. His work leads to the development of streptokinase, used to combat heart attacks.
1941: The first department of physical medicine and rehabilitation in the United States is established at NYU.
1941-45: During the war years, NYU-trained Julius Axelrod, M.D., works with James Shannon, M.D., and other faculty members in the Medical Schools malaria program. Dr. Axelrod is later awarded the Nobel Prize for Medicine.
1947: A site for a new Medical Center, consisting of the NYU School of Medicine, the Post-Graduate Medical School, University (now Tisch) Hospital, and the Rusk Institute of Rehabilitation Medicine, is selected. The Institute of Industrial Medicine is established.
1948: University Hospital is created through a merger of the New York Post-Graduate Hospital and New York Skin and Cancer Hospital.
1955: The Medical Science Building and the Henry W. and Albert Berg Institute opens at NYU.
1957: The Hall of Research and Alumni Hall are constructed.
1959: The Nobel Prize for Medicine is awarded to NYU faculty member Severo Ochoa, M.D., for his seminal study of biochemical genetics and nucleic acids.
1960: The Clinical Research Center, funded by the NIH, is established at NYU.
1960s: NYU pathologist Baruj Benacerraf, M.D., conducts pioneering research on genetic regulation of the immune system, for which he is later awarded the Nobel Prize in medicine in 1980.
1963: The new University Hospital opens.
1964: NYU establishes one of the first three Medical Scientist Training Programs (dual MD/PhD graduate programs funded by the NIH) in the United States.
1964: The Institute and Department of Environmental Medicine are established.
1975: One of the first designated national cancer centers is established at NYU, later named the Rita and Stanley H. Kaplan Center.
1981: NYU scientists present the first evidence linking rare cancer, Kaposi's sarcoma, with immune deficiency in a distinct population of homosexual men, a key step in identifying AIDS.
1992: NYU Medical Center opens Women's Health Services under the auspices of the Departments of Obstetrics and Gynecology and Radiology.
1993: The School of Medicine's Skirball Institute of Biomolecular Medicine is opened as an uncompromising commitment to the advancement and understanding of molecular approaches for the treatment of various important diseases.
1995: The Sir Harold Acton Society is established to recognize donors of $1 million or more.  
1998: NYU Medical Center is restructured, creating the "NYU Hospitals Center" (including Tisch Hospital and Rusk Institute), the "NYU Health System" (consisting of NYU Hospitals Center, Hospital for Joint Diseases and NYU Downtown Hospital), and the "NYU School of Medicine" which remains an administrative unit of New York University.
2004: The NYU Clinical Cancer Center is opened (now called NYU Langone Health Perlmutter Cancer Center), an NCI-Designated comprehensive cancer center..
2004:  The Nobel Prize for Chemistry is awarded to the distinguished NYU adjunct faculty member Avram Hershko, M.D., for his seminal discovery of the ubiquitin system in protein degradation. 
2006: Hospital for Joint Diseases merges with NYU Medical Center and is renamed the NYU Hospital for Joint Diseases.
2006: The School of Medicine's Joan and Joel Smilow Research Center is opened to house 4 major programmatic areas: Cancer, Pathology, Dermatology/Cutaneous Biology, and Cardiovascular Biology.  
2013:  NYU School of Medicine introduces accelerated three-year MD program. 
2014:  NYU Grossman School of Medicine expands into The Alexandria Center of Life Science to host the  Department of Biochemistry & Molecular Pharmacology and the Department of Microbiology, as well as the facilities of Proteomics and Metabolomics.
2018: NYU Grossman School of Medicine announced it would be offering full-tuition scholarships to all current and future students in its MD degree program.
2019: NYU Langone Health partnered with NYU to form NYU Long Island School of Medicine, a new, three-year medical school located at NYU Langone Hospital—Long Island.
2019:  NYU Grossman School of Medicine's Science Building  is opened, encompassing more than 365,000 square feet and 10 floors of laboratory space dedicated to research in the area of Human Genetics, System Biology, Neurobiology, and Medicine.

Institutional pedigrees

Academics
In 2010, NYU Grossman School of Medicine implemented a curriculum consisting of 18 months of basic science and two and a half years of clinical training. Students take the USMLE Step 1 exam after the clerkship year (with the exception of MD/PhD students, who take it before starting their PhD work). The curriculum also includes NYU3T (a joint program with the New York University College of Nursing) and PLACE (Patient-Based Longitudinal Ambulatory Care Experience).

NYU Grossman School of Medicine also offers 5-year joint degree programs, some of which can be optionally completed in 4 years:
 MD/MPA in Health Policy and Management (with the Robert F. Wagner Graduate School of Public Service)
 MD/MPH in Global Health
MD/MS in Biomedical Informatics
MD/MS in Translational Research
 MD/MBA in General Management (with the New York University Stern School of Business)
 MD/MA in Bioethics
For scientists and physician–scientists, the School of Medicine offers PhD, MD/PhD, and postdoctoral programs at Vilcek Institute of Graduate Biomedical Sciences at NYU Langone Health.

In 2010, NYU Grossman School of Medicine introduced a 3-year MD program based on the program first pioneered in Canada at McMaster University Medical School in 1965. The 3-year program can only be applied to by students accepted into the 4 year stream. 3-year program students are guaranteed a residency placement in their specialty of choice at NYU Langone Health. They complete their preclinical training at the same time as 4 year students, however they start clinical rotations 6 weeks earlier and also spend the summer after their first year doing a summer fellowship in the department of their specialty of choice.

Notable people

Notes

External links

NYU Medical Center / School of Medicine
NYU School of Medicine / Library and Archives - Main Page
NYU School of Medicine / Library and Archives - Alumni and Photograph Databases

1841 establishments in New York (state)
Medicine, School of
Schools of medicine in New York City
Educational institutions established in 1841
Kips Bay, Manhattan